Loiter Squad is an American adult sketch comedy television series for Adult Swim starring Tyler, the Creator, Jasper Dolphin, Taco Bennett, Earl Sweatshirt, and Lionel Boyce from the Los Angeles hip hop group Odd Future. The show regularly featured other members of the group as well.

The show was produced by Dickhouse Productions for Cartoon Network's Adult Swim programming block during its first and second seasons. The show ran from March 25, 2012 to July 17, 2014

On July 14, 2015, Tyler, the Creator confirmed that the show was "no more," stating, “It opened the doors up for other things that my boys want to do. That was a great thing, but we’re off that.”

History
The pilot for the show was initially announced on March 11, 2011, after Los Angeles hip hop collective Odd Future began to receive mainstream recognition, with the premise originally being described as a combination of Jackass and Chappelle's Show. Later, the series was rumored to be named Blackass, a portmanteau of the TV series Jackass, due to an on-air bump from Adult Swim claiming that was the temporary title, "at least until S&P calls" them out on it. However, on April 22, 2011, Tyler, the Creator debunked the title on his official Twitter account, potentially not even knowing its origin. Then, it was not until September 8, 2011 that the show, by then officially titled Loiter Squad, was finally confirmed as a 15-minute live action show composed of various sketches, man on the street segments, pranks, and music made by Odd Future.

Loiter Squad premiered on Sunday, March 25, 2012 on Cartoon Network's Adult Swim programming block. Episode 2 featured an appearance from Jackass alumnus Johnny Knoxville while fellow Jackass cast members Bam Margera, Chris Pontius and Dave England have also made guest appearances. Other appearances have included rappers Xzibit, Lil Wayne and Juicy J, actor Seth Rogen, and Indie rock musician Mac Demarco. In 2012, it was announced that Earl Sweatshirt and Blake Anderson would join the cast at the show's second season.

Loiter Squad was renewed for a third season and premiered on May 15, 2014. It was produced by Gorilla Flicks, the new production company of Jeff Tremaine, and by Camp Flog Gnaw, the production company of Tyler, the Creator.

In July 2015, Tyler, the Creator stated that Loiter Squad would not continue after its third season.

Cast

Main cast
 Tyler, the Creator
 Jasper Dolphin
 Taco Bennett
 Lionel Boyce
 Earl Sweatshirt

Guest appearances
Notable guest appearances include:
 Johnny Knoxville
 Blake Anderson
 Tony Hawk
 Seth Rogen
 Mac Miller
 George Clinton
 Xzibit
 Mac DeMarco
 Bam Margera
 Kanye West
 Fatlip
 Chris Pontius
 Dave England
 Lil Wayne
 Juicy J
 Freddie Gibbs
 The Alchemist
 IceJJFish
 Kel Mitchell
 Shelby Fero
 The Dudesons

Episodes

Season 1 (2012)

Season 2 (2013)

Season 3 (2014)

See also
 The Jellies!

References

Notes

External links
 
 

2012 American television series debuts
2014 American television series endings
2010s American black television series
2010s American sketch comedy television series
Adult Swim original programming
Hip hop television
English-language television shows
Odd Future
Television series by Williams Street
Television series by Dickhouse Productions
Tyler, the Creator